is a town in Kamikawa Subprefecture in Hokkaido, Japan. Translated into English, Takasu means "hawk's nest". As of April 2020, the town has an estimated population of 6,780 people.

Geography 
Takasu is located in the central area of Hokkaido, the most northern island in Japan. Takasu has an approximate land area of 139.44 km², and is located near Asahikawa, the second largest city in Hokkaido. Numerous rivers run through the town of Takasu, with the main one being the Osarappe River, which runs from north to south, and is approximately 25.7 km in length. Another major river is the Ishikari River which flows from Mt. Daisetsu, a volcanic peak in central Hokkaido.

Climate 
From late November to mid-April, Takasu experiences a heavy snowfall, with depths reaching 1.3 metres. Mid-January to late February is the coldest period, with minimum temperatures reaching as low as -30 °C. Summer temperatures occasionally exceed 30 °C; however low humidity means that Takasu enjoys a mild and comfortable summer.

Overall, Takasu experiences four distinct seasons; each possessing a unique characteristic. Winter brings a heavy blanket of powder snow; spring sees the bloom of cherry blossoms and sucklings sprout; summer provides a landscape filled with green, as harvest prospers; and the autumn brings the crisp red leaves of Japanese maple trees.

Industry 
With an abundance of fertile land, Takasu has developed an agricultural sector centred on rice growing. Rice accounts for 80 per cent of Takasu's total agricultural product. In recent years, Takasu has been one of the eminent producers of Hokkaido Hoshi no Yume and Kirara 397 rice in terms of quality and harvest. The next biggest industry in Takasu is the production of vegetables, particularly tomatoes. Takasu is the centre of production for a range of Ookami no momo brand tomato products, such as tomato juice and puree.

Takasu is also home to one of Honda's "Proving Grounds". Honda tests new products to see how they stand up to the harsh winter conditions found in central Hokkaido. The other Honda development facility is found in Tochigi Prefecture. Honda not only test cars at the Takasu Proving Grounds, but bikes and snowblowers.

Emblem and symbols 

The Takasu town emblem was established on January 1, 1968, from ideas submitted by the local citizens. The town emblem incorporates four meaningful elements. Firstly, it is a modern representation of a hawk, the town's namesake, with wings spread in full flight. The oval in the centre symbolises a grain of rice, which is a major produce in Takasu. Finally, the single line making a circle symbolises the harmony and unity between the citizens, while the twist of the line represents the bright future of Takasu.

Takasu has two other official town symbols – the marigold is the town flower, and mountain ash is the town tree.

Domestic exchange program 
Takasu has a domestic school exchange program with Takashima Town in Nagasaki Prefecture. Since 1996 a delegation of ten students from each town visits the other, and stays with local families. The purpose of this domestic exchange program is to strengthen friendship and understanding between citizens in the two towns.

Sister city 
Takasu currently has one sister city relationship with the Gold Coast, in Queensland, Australia. This relationship initially commenced in 1991, as a friendly relations agreement with the Albert Shire region of the Gold Coast. Upon the Albert Shire's amalgamation with the Gold Coast City, the relationship between Takasu and the Gold Coast was upgraded to an official Sister City Agreement in 1995.

Culture

Mascot

He is a hawk who usually active in various situations and can jump. He carries a flask of  peach juice in his blue backpack for any situations to ensure survival. He sometimes disguises himself as a snowman. He is first appeared on 8 August 1995 as an unofficial mascot before he was promoted into official mascot in 2013.

References

External links

 Official Website 

Towns in Hokkaido